Fatherland League  may refer to:
Fatherland League (Netherlands)
Fatherland League (Norway)